Dalia Dokšaitė (born 4 May 1955) is a Lithuanian painter who uses the ink wash technique. Dokšaitė has held personal exhibitions at various galleries, including the Kawamura Memorial Art Museum in Japan and the exhibition gallery of the Lithuanian Seimas.

Writing
"The Monochromatic ZEN Painting sumi-e in Japan", Indra, 2000.
"The Place Where Samogitians Get Their Strength, or How Are We Like the Japanese?", .

Implemented educational projects 
"Art to Children"
"The Language of Symbols in Lithuanian Art"
"The Secrets of Watercolour"
"The Path of the Sun"

References

External links 
 Dalia Dokšaitė Exhibition in Kawamura Memorial Museum of Art and NHK Gallery, Japan

1955 births
Living people
20th-century Lithuanian women artists
21st-century Lithuanian women artists
Lithuanian painters